Phaleria is flowering plant genus of about 20-25 species in the family Thymelaeaceae.

Uses
Some species, like the mahkota dewa are known to produce agarwood. Many others have long histories of use in traditional medicine like delal a kar (which translates to "the mother of medicines") which is used as a panacea by Palauans.

Species

 Phaleria acuminata  — Fiji, American Samoa, Tonga, Western Samoa
 Phaleria angustifolia  — Fiji
 Phaleria biflora  – Qld, Australia endemic
 Phaleria capitata  – salagong-gubat (Sri Lanka, Palau, Malaysia, Sumatra, Borneo, Java, Philippines, Sulawesi, Moluccas, New Guinea)
 Phaleria chermsideana  – Qld, NSW, Australia
 Phaleria clerodendron  – scented daphne (Qld, Australia)
 Phaleria coccinea  – New Guinea, New Britain, Moluccas, Philippines
 Phaleria disperma  – Fiji, Niue, Samoa, Tonga, Wallis and Futuna
 Phaleria elegans  – New Guinea endemic
 Phaleria glabra  — Fiji, Tonga
 Phaleria ixoroides  — Fiji
 Phaleria lanceolata  — Fiji
 Phaleria longituba  — New Guinea
 Phaleria macrocarpa  (Syn.: P. papuana) – mahkota dewa (New Guinea, NT, Australia)
 Phaleria montana  — Fiji
 Phaleria nisidai  — delal a kar (Palau, New Britain, New Guinea)
 Phaleria octandra  – dwarf phaleria (New Guinea, Moluccas, Lesser Sunda Islands (Timor, Flores, Lombok, Bali, etc.), Java, NT, Qld, Australia)
 Phaleria okapensis  — New Guinea (Papau)
 Phaleria pentecostalis  — Vanuatu
 Phaleria perrottetiana  – New Guinea, Moluccas, Borneo, Philippines
 Phaleria pilistyla  — New Guinea (Papua)
 Phaleria pubiflora  — Fiji
 Phaleria pulchra  — Fiji
 Phaleria sogerensis  – New Guinea
 Phaleria stevensiana  — Sulawesi

Taxonomy and phylogeny
Phylogenetic analysis shows that Phaleria'''s closest related genus is Dais, both of which are members of the Thymelaeoideae subfamily of the Thymelaeaceae family which contains 941 species in 48 different genera according to the Catalogue of Life. The next closest related genera is a clade containing Gnidia, Stephanodaphne, Dirca, Ovidia, Peddiea, Pimelea, Struthiola, Lachnaea, Passerina, and Passerina''.

References

 
Malvales genera